Crop Alvand Iranian Futsal Club (Bāshgāh-e Futsāl-e Krāp Alvand-e Irāniyān) is an Iranian professional futsal club based in Alvand.

Season to season
The table below chronicles the achievements of the Club in various competitions.

Last updated: 12 March 2022

Notes:
* unofficial titles
1 worst title in history of club

Key

P   = Played
W   = Games won
D   = Games drawn
L   = Games lost

GF  = Goals for
GA  = Goals against
Pts = Points
Pos = Final position

Honours 

 Iran Futsal's 1st Division
 Runners-up (1): 2019–20

Players

Current squad

Personnel

Current technical staff

Last updated: 6 September 2022

Managers

Last updated: 6 September 2022

References 

Futsal clubs in Iran
Sport in Qazvin
Futsal clubs established in 2019
2019 establishments in Iran